Lotta Schultz (born 23 February 1968) is a Swedish equestrian. She competed in two events at the 2008 Summer Olympics.

References

External links
 

1968 births
Living people
Swedish female equestrians
Olympic equestrians of Sweden
Equestrians at the 2008 Summer Olympics
Sportspeople from Uppsala